Alberta Health Services (AHS) which is headquartered in Edmonton, Alberta is the single health authority for the Canadian province of Alberta and the "largest integrated provincial health care system" in Canada. AHS delivers medical care on behalf of the provincial Government of Alberta Ministry of Health It operates 850 facilities throughout the province, including hospitals, clinics, continuing care facilities, mental health facilities and community health sites, that provide a variety of programs and services. AHS is the largest employer in the province of Alberta. In 2019, AHS served 4.3 million Albertans with a staff of 125,000 staff and 10,000 physicians, and an annual budget of $15.365 billion. Mauro Chies is the interim President and CEO of AHS and reports to Dr. John Cowell, the AHS Official Administrator. The Official Administrator is accountable to the Minister of Health and the Premier.

Overview
According to the December 31, 2019 Ernst & Young review of AHS performance commissioned by Alberta Health, Alberta has Canada's "largest integrated provincial health care system". AHS serves 4.3 million Albertans and has a staff of 125,000 staff and 10,000 physicians. Ernst & Young said that AHS was "one of Canada's top 100 employers." AHS foundations raise over $250 million annually. In 2019, AHS served 4.3 million Albertans with a staff of 125,000 staff and 10,000 physicians, and an annual budget of $15.365 billion. The AHS reports to Minister of Health Jason Copping with Mauro Chies serving as interim AHS President and CEO. According to the AHS 2020 annual report, their workforces includes over 108,600 Albertans. Additionally, there are 35,750 Albertans who "support the delivery of healthcare services in AHS as physicians, midwives, subsidiary staff and volunteers," AHS serves 4.4 million people who reside in Alberta. In their 2020 annual report, AHS is "one of three entities within the Ministry of Health, delivering a broad range of health care on behalf of government, in accordance with the mandate set by government."

History

From 1992 to 2000, Alberta's Conservative Premier Ralph Klein's oversaw deep cuts to provincial health as part of his focus on eliminating Alberta's deficit. Klein replaced hundreds of local boards of directors of hospitals, long-term care and public health services, with 17 health authorities based on geographic regions. He also created provincial health authorities for cancer, mental health and addiction services. Per capita spending on health was cut from CA $1,393 in 1992 to $1,156 in 1995. At the same time, Klein eliminated or reduced hours for 14,753 positions in health care. Three downtown hospitals were closed by the Calgary Regional Health Authority—one of the hospitals was leased to an American for-profit health group" and the old "Calgary General Hospital was blown up in October 1998". This left many Calgarians "without access to emergency care in the downtown core." The "controlled implosion of Calgary General Hospital"—the Big Bang—was described as the "dawn of a regionalized, integrated healthcare system in Alberta."

The Alberta Health Services, which was established on May 15, 2008, is a quasi-independent agency of the Alberta government with a mandate to public health services throughout the province under the Ministry of Health.

Ed Stelmach, who served as Alberta's premier from December 2006 to October 2011, as leader of the Progressive Conservative Association of Alberta, introduced major reforms to Alberta's health-care system. On May 15, 2008, Health Minister Ron Liepert announced that as of April 1, 2009, one provincial governance board—the Alberta Health Services Board—would consolidate the "$13-billion-a-year system into one public corporation", replacing Alberta's nine regional health authority boards— Aspen Health Region, Calgary Health Region, Capital Health Region, Chinook Health Region, David Thompson Health Region, East Central Health Region, Northern Lights Health Region, Palliser Health Region, and Peace Country Health Region.

On April 1, 2009, the Health Governance Transition Amendment Act dissolved the Alberta Mental Health Board, the Alberta Cancer Board and the Alberta Alcohol and Drug Abuse Commission, and completed the transition to Alberta Health Services (AHS).

Prior to these changes, health services in Alberta had undergone several governance reorganization which had resulted in fewer separate public organizational entities, in 1996, 2003, and 2006.

The Ernst & Young December 2019 review said that the AHS could save "up to $1.9 billion annually". The NDP opposition called the UCP's proposed changes to AHS, the "Americanization of AHS."

Organization
AHS provides health services to some patients in British Columbia, Saskatchewan, and the Northwest Territories, as well as to over 4.3 million Albertans.

Alberta Health Services has been organized so as to separate acute hospital facilities (with separate reporting lines for major tertiary, metropolitan and regional hospitals) from smaller hospitals and community services, the latter of which are organized into five zones (North, Edmonton, Central, Calgary and South).  The Calgary Zone, for example, includes some sites and services formerly administered by the Calgary Health Region while other services have been reorganized on a provincial scale.

Governance
Stephen Duckett was the inaugural president and chief executive officer of the newly created health "superboard", Alberta Health Services, and served from the spring of 2009 until November 2010, when then-provincial Health Minister Gene Zwozdesky asked him to resign. Significant budget cuts—of about CA $1 billion—were imposed on AHS by Premier Stelmach, soon after Duckett's appointment.

Chris Eagle served as AHS CEO from November 23, 2010, until October 17, 2013.

On June 12, 2013, Minister of Health Fred Horne fired the entire AHS Board over its refusal to cancel executive bonuses. Three days later, Janet Davidson was appointed the AHS official administrator by Minister Horne to act in place of its board of directors. On September 12, 2013, John W. F. Cowell replaced Davidson as the official administrator. AHS has subsequently had Carl Amrhein and David Carpenter as official administrators.

The Alberta Health Services Board was re-introduced, effective November 27, 2015 with Linda Hughes appointed as the board chair.

On April 4, 2022, the AHS Board asked Mauro Chies, Vice President, Cancer Care Alberta and Clinical Support Services, to serve in the role of interim CEO on a temporary basis.

Dr. Verna Yiu served as AHS CEO and president from June 3, 2016, to April 4, 2022.

In 2021, Gregory Turnbull, QC served as board chair, Dr. Sayeh Zielke as vice-chair, and Brian Vaasjo, Deborah Apps, Heidi Overguard, Dr. Jack Mintz, Natalia Reiman, Sherri Fountain, Hartley Harris, Tony Dagnone, OC and Vicki Yellow Old Woman serve as board members.

On Nov. 17, 2022, Dr. John Cowell was appointed Official Administrator for Alberta Health Services (AHS) by the Minister of Health and replaced the existing board of directors. The Official Administrator has responsibility for the governance of AHS, working in partnership with Alberta Health to ensure all Albertans have access to high quality health services across the province. The Official Administrator is accountable to the Minister of Health and the Premier.

Employees
By 2019, Alberta Health Services employs over 103,000 staff and more than 8,200 physicians, including clinical, administrative and support personnel across the province. Staff belong to a variety of professional organizations and associations, including United Nurses of Alberta, several locals of the Alberta Union of Provincial Employees, and the Health Sciences Association of Alberta.

"Two Indigenous doctors say Alberta Health Services dismissed their concerns about a manager who sent racist and inappropriate emails to physicians, including about the upcoming visit to Alberta by Pope Francis. Dr. Ellen Toth, the AHS administrator in charge of ensuring Indigenous communities have physician coverage, shared an application form with colleagues. "Pretty impressive CV.. U of A grad… prolly brown…"

"Toth added about the doctor, who is male: "I will talk to her, essentially to get a sense if there is a bad accent (I doubt it if she went through U of A)..."

"Makokis, who is Kehewin Cree Nation's only family doctor, said Toth's words were included in a response to the applying doctor. Makokis said he was "shocked and embarrassed and angry" when he saw the email. He apologized to the locum doctor, and replied to Toth and other recipients that the message was racist."

"In response, Toth wrote to a group of people who had received the email: "I take full responsibility for my innate racism … which should not be a surprise given my blue eyes and origins…"

"During the next two months, Makokis tried to elevate his concerns to AHS senior leaders. He said it eroded his confidence in the organization's ability to respond appropriately to racist incidents when Toth remained in a leadership role for a program that delivers health care to Indigenous people."

"In a June 24 email to Makokis and several others, Dr. Mark Joffe, an AHS vice-president, called Toth's message "highly inappropriate and racist" but said "appropriate steps have been taken."

"On Friday, July 15, 2022, AHS spokesperson Kerry Williamson told CBC News the organization conducted an internal investigation and told Toth her message was unacceptable. He wouldn't say if Toth faced any discipline, saying it was a private human resources matter."

Facilities

By 2010, AHS was maintaining and running a number of different types of facilities and services. These included Cancer care for the prevention, detection, treatment, education and care of cancer patients, as well as to facilitate research of cancer; continuing and long-term care
for the treatment of patients with complex health needs requiring 24-hour on-site services from registered nurses; emergency for immediate care of patients with all types of conditions; hospitals for medical, surgical, or psychiatric care of the sick and injured. There were also laboratories for the processing of medical samples and tests; mental health and addictions services for treatment and care of patients diagnosed with mental health or addiction issues and emergency medical services.

AHS is directly responsible for both ground and air ambulance operations in the province, provided through a mix of both direct delivery and contracted providers.

A wider array of miscellaneous health facilities include physiotherapy, occupational therapy, home care, hemodialysis and others, and also include Public Health Centres which provide services such as prenatal, postpartum, health promotion/disease and injury prevention, bereavement services, communicable disease and school health.  They also fund affordable housing for seniors at facilities, such as Silvera for Seniors.

Urgent care services include treating patients with unexpected but not life-threatening issues requiring same day treatment.

AHS also operates X-ray and imaging clinics for procedures such as MRIs, X-rays and other types of scans.

Laboratories

In the early 1990s, most of Edmonton's hospital labs were privatized.  The Edmonton regional health authority had a 15-year contract with the private company Dynalife, which was ending in the early 2010s.

The provincial government ordered regional health authorities to cut lab spending, which resulted in more public laboratories being established by 2005.

By 2006, all of the lab services in Calgary were under public control.

In December 2013, Alberta Health Services proceeded with "its plan to privatize all of its diagnostic lab services in Edmonton". AHS sent out request for proposals (RFP) for a "private provider to establish a single $3 billion lab for the Edmonton Zone." By October 16, 2014, Australia's Sonic Healthcare, a private company, had been selected. They would have replaced "hospital labs operated by AHS and Covenant Health, as well as the services now provided by the private company Dynalife." When the NDP won the 2015 Alberta general election, the contract with Sonic was cancelled.

By 2016, the largest medical testing facility in northern Alberta was the a central laboratory facility owned and operated by a private company in Edmonton, Dynalife. As of January 23, 2016, DynaLIFE Dx was owned by Toronto-headquartered LifeLabs and the Burlington, North Carolina-headquartered LabCorp, or Laboratory Corporation of America Holdings, which operates one of the largest clinical laboratory networks in the world. LabCorp had acquired all outstanding shares of Canadian medical laboratory services company Dynacare Inc. for $480 million in May 2002.

In August 2016, Elisabeth Ballermann, then-President of the Health Sciences Association of Alberta (HSAA), which represented 1,600 lab workers in both the private and public sector, said that HSAA members had "long wanted lab services delivered by the public system". Ballerman said she was convinced they could work in the public sector. She expressed concern that under the contract, the new facility to house the Edmonton lab would be owned by a private company, not by Albertans.

In April 2016, then-Premier Rachel Notley, leader of the Alberta New Democratic Party, announced that the Alberta New Democratic Party (NDP) government was beginning the process of taking over testing done by Dynacare as part of the NDP's campaign promises during the 2015 Alberta general election, to "bring medical lab services under greater public control."

The newly elected United Conservative Party (UCP) government's Health Minister Tyler Shandro, cancelled the construction of a new super-lab—a "$595-million centralized public lab facility next to the University of Alberta's south campus".  Shandro also exited the "planned $50-million buyout of private lab services company Dynalife by 2022", saying that he disagreed with the NDP's decision to "nationalize Dynalife – to nationalize laboratory services in Alberta."

On October 24, 2019, under Health Minister Shandro, Alberta's consolidated laboratory services previously provided by multiple organizations in Alberta under the newly named Alberta Precision Laboratories Ltd (APL), a wholly owned subsidiary of AHS, with Tammy Hofer as Chief Operating Officer (CFO) and Dr. Carolyn O'Hara as Chief Medical Laboratory Officer (CMLO). Prior to consolidation and during the transition period, laboratory services were provided to AHS through Calgary Lab Services (CLS), Covenant Health—the largest Catholic health-care provider in Canada, DynaLIFE, Laboratory Services (AHS), Medicine Hat & Brooks Collection Sites, and Lamont Health Care Centre.

As of October 2019, APL continued to "work collaboratively with DynaLIFE, under contract to provide lab services in Alberta." By November 30, 2019, the union that represents public laboratory workers expressed concern that 850 jobs in the public labs, could be lost, after Minister Shandro and APL sent out a Request for Expression of Interest (RFOI), "to gauge market interest from private third parties for the provision of community lab services in Alberta" as part of their investigation into "new service delivery models."

AHS testing services include AHS Lab Services (Central, Edmonton, North and South zones), Genetic Lab Services, ProvLab, Calgary Laboratory Services, and DynaLIFE Medical Labs.

ProvLab, which "operates under Alberta Health Services (AHS) Laboratory Services" and has "been in existence for over 100 years", was renamed Public Health Laboratories. It is based in Calgary's Foothills Medical Centre and Edmonton's University of Alberta Hospital in Edmonton. Its focus on "public health and specialized microbiology" including "surveillance, research, specialized laboratory testing and outbreak and emerging infectious diseases response."

During the COVID-19 pandemic in Alberta, Alberta Precision Laboratories (APL), a wholly owned subsidiary of AHS, undertook testing for the virus.

South Zone
The south zone includes major centres such as Lethbridge and Medicine Hat serving approximately 309,000 Albertans.
A large network of hospitals is maintained in the outlying communities of Alberta. South Zone includes

South zone hospitals include Big Country Health Centre (Oyen), Bassano Health Centre (Bassano), Bow Island Health Centre (Bow Island), Brooks Health Centre (Brooks), Cardston Health Centre (Cardston), Chinook Regional Hospital (Lethbridge), Coaldale Health Centre (Coaldale), Crowsnest Pass Health Centre (Blairmore), Fort Macleod Health Centre (Fort Macleod), Medicine Hat Regional Hospital (Medicine Hat), Milk River Health Centre (Milk River), Piiyami Health Centre (Picture Butte), Pincher Creek Health Centre (Pincher Creek), Raymond Health Centre (Raymond), and Taber Health Centre (Taber).

Calgary Zone
The Calgary Zone administrative offices are located in the Southland Park business complex. Calgary Zone comprises territory formerly administered by the former Calgary Health Region and includes five major acute care sites (hospitals) including Foothills Medical Centre, Peter Lougheed Centre, Rockyview General Hospital, South Health Campus, and Alberta Children's Hospital. Serving approximately 1,700,000 Albertans.

A large network of hospitals are maintained in the outlying communities of Alberta. Calgary Zone includes Canmore General Hospital (Canmore), Claresholm General Hospital (Claresholm), Didsbury District Health Services (Didsbury), High River General Hospital (High River), Strathmore District Health Services (Strathmore), and Vulcan Community Health Centre (Vulcan).

Central Zone
The central zone includes major centres such as Red Deer.  Serving approximately 480,000 Albertans.
A large network of hospitals are maintained in the outlying communities of Alberta. Central Zone includes
Castor - Our Lady of the Rosary Hospital (Castor)
Consort Hospital and Care Centre (Consort)
Coronation Hospital and Care Centre (Coronation)

Edmonton Zone
Serving approximately 1.4 million Albertans, the Edmonton Zone administrative offices are located in Seventh Street Plaza. The Edmonton Zone comprises territory formerly administered by the Capital Health Region and includes eight acute care sites (hospitals) in the metropolitan area, which include. 
 Alberta Hospital Edmonton (Edmonton)
 Devon General Hospital (Devon)
 Fort Saskatchewan Community Hospital (Fort Saskatchewan)
 Glenrose Rehabilitation Hospital (Edmonton)
 Grey Nuns Community Hospital (Edmonton)
 Leduc Community Hospital (Leduc
 Misericordia Community Hospital (Edmonton)
 Royal Alexandra Hospital  (Edmonton)
 St. Joseph's Auxiliary Hospital (Edmonton)
 Stollery Children's Hospital (Edmonton) 
 Strathcona Community Hospital (Sherwood Park)
 Sturgeon Community Hospital (St. Albert)
 University of Alberta Hospital (Edmonton) 
 WestView Health Centre (Stony Plain)

North Zone
The north zone includes major centres such as Grande Prairie and Fort McMurray.  Serving approximately 480,000 Albertans.
A large network of hospitals are maintained in the outlying communities of Alberta. North Zone includes
Grande Prairie Regional Hospital (Grande Prairie)
Queen Elizabeth II Ambulatory Care Centre (Grande Prairie)
Athabasca Healthcare Centre (Athabasca)
Barrhead Healthcare Centre (Barrhead)
Beaverlodge Municipal Hospital (Beaverlodge)
Bonnyville Healthcare Centre (Bonnyville)
Boyle Healthcare Centre (Boyle)
Central Peace Health Complex (Spirit River)
Cold Lake Healthcare Centre (Cold Lake)
St. Therese Healthcare Centre (St. Paul)

Rural Zone
A large network of hospitals are maintained in the outlying communities of Alberta. They include

Cardston Health Centre (Cardston, Alberta)
Crowsnest Pass Health Centre (Blairmore)
Daysland Health Centre (Daysland)
Devon General Hospital (Devon)
Drayton Valley Hospital and Care Centre (Drayton Valley)
Drumheller Health Centre (Drumheller)
Edson Healthcare Centre (Edson)
Elk Point Healthcare Centre (Elk Point)
Fairview Health Complex (Fairview)
Fort McMurray Northern Lights Regional Health Centre (Fort McMurray)
Fort Saskatchewan Health Centre (Fort Saskatchewan)
Fort Vermilion St. Theresa General Hospital (Fort Vermilion)
Fox Creek Health Care Centre (Fox Creek)
Grande Cache Community Health Complex (Grande Cache)
Grimshaw/Berwyn Community Health Complex (Grimshaw)
Hanna Health Centre (Hanna)
Hardisty Health Centre (Hardisty)
High Level Northwest Health Centre (High Level)
High Prairie Health Complex (High Prairie)
Hinton Healthcare Centre (Hinton)
Innisfail Health Centre (Innisfail)
Jasper - Seton Healthcare Centre (Jasper)
Killam Health Care Centre (Killam)
Lac La Biche - William J. Cadzow Healthcare Centre (Lac La Biche)
Lacombe Hospital and Care Centre (Lacombe)
Lamont Health Care Centre (Lamont)
Leduc Community Hospital (Leduc)
Manning Community Health Centre (Manning)
Mayerthorpe Healthcare Centre (Mayerthorpe)
Medicine Hat Regional Hospital (Medicine Hat)
Oilfields General Hospital (Black Diamond)
Olds Hospital and Care Centre (Olds)
Oyen - Big Country Hospital (Oyen)
Peace River Community Health Centre (Peace River)
Pincher Creek Health Centre (Pincher Creek)
Ponoka Hospital and Care Centre (Ponoka)
Provost Health Centre (Provost)
Queen Elizabeth II Hospital (Grande Prairie)
Raymond Health Centre (Raymond)
Red Deer Regional Hospital (Red Deer)
Redwater Health Centre (Redwater)
Rimbey Hospital and Care Centre (Rimbey)
Rocky Mountain House Health Centre (Rocky Mountain House)
Sacred Heart Community Health Centre (McLennan)
Slave Lake Healthcare Centre (Slave Lake)
Smoky Lake - George McDougall Healthcare Centre (Smoky Lake)
St. Joseph's General Hospital (Vegreville)
St. Mary's Hospital (Camrose)
St. Paul - St. Therese Healthcare Centre (St. Paul)
Stettler Hospital and Care Centre (Stettler)
Stony Plain - WestView Health Centre (Stony Plain)
Sturgeon Community Hospital (St. Albert)
Sundre Hospital and Care Centre (Sundre)
Swan Hills Healthcare Centre (Swan Hills)
Sylvan Lake Community Health Centre (Sylvan Lake)
Taber Health Centre (Taber)
Three Hills Health Centre (Three Hills)
Tofield Health Centre (Tofield)
Two Hills Health Centre (Two Hills)
Valleyview Health Centre (Valleyview)
Vermilion Health Centre (Vermilion)
Viking Health Centre (Viking)
Wabasca/Desmarais Healthcare Centre (Wabasca)
Wainwright Health Centre (Wainwright)
Westlock Healthcare Centre (Westlock)
Wetaskiwin Hospital and Care Centre (Wetaskiwin)
Whitecourt Healthcare Centre (Whitecourt)

Emergency Medical Services

Alberta's Emergency Medical Services, which include both ground services, air ambulances have been the responsibility of AHS since April 1, 2009. This includes inter-facility hospital transfers and EMS dispatch. Prior to 2019,  municipalities were responsible for providing ground services. By April 10, the provincial air ambulance had also transitioned to AHS.

In 2019, EMS averaged about 590,000 ambulance responses annually, with approximately 30% of these being patient transfers between health care facilities, and 70% being emergency responses.

In 2013, AHS  hybrid model of service provision—which included contracted air ambulance providers—consisted of 204 ground ambulance locations. In 2010, AHS contracts 12 fixed-wing aircraft to provide 24-hour air ambulance services throughout the province and in that year, 5,500 patients were transferred by fixed-wing aircraft via contracted air ambulance providers. By 2013, there were about 3,000 paramedics, emergency medical technicians and emergency medical responders with There are 550 ambulances throughout the province, including 278 owned and operated by AHS. AHS EMS consists of numerous ground ambulances providing Advanced Life Support (ALS), Basic Life Support (BLS) and single ALS Paramedic Response Unit (PRU) response capable units. 

The AHS EMS Special Operations Division is composed of members who specialize in a variety of qualifications including; Rapid Access Paramedics capable of providing access to festivals and large gatherings utilizing bicycles, golf carts and a variety of response vehicles. Incident Response Paramedics (IRP) whose primary role is providing expertise on CBRNE, Hazmat, and Mass Casualty Incidents. Public Safety Unit (PSU) paramedics who provide medical support to municipal police services during large gatherings and Tactical Emergency Medical Support (TEMS) paramedics who provide medical support/expertise to municipal police tactical teams during operations.

AHS EMS Rank Structure

Protective Services
Alberta Health Services provides physical security, asset and staff protection, and various law enforcement capabilities at corporate properties.  This is accomplished with a multi-tiered system including Corporate Investigations, Peace Officers and contracted security companies across Alberta.

Comparison with other provinces
In general, Alberta, which has been the province with the highest GDP per capita for decades, spends more money per capita on public services, including on health, than any other Canadian province. This disparity between Alberta's healthcare spending and other provinces is often a topical election issue and was a focus of the MacKinnon Report. According to a 2019 report, health care accounts for about 43% of the public expenditures in the province.

References

External links

Health regions of Alberta
Alberta government departments and agencies
Organizations based in Edmonton
2008 establishments in Alberta